Romeo Papini (born 21 March 1983) is an Italian footballer who plays for Voluntas Spoleto.

Biography
Born in Rome, Lazio, Papini started his career at Serie B team Ternana.

Later, between 2003 and 2005 he was loaned to Legnano and Pavia. In the 2005–06 season he returned to plays with Ternana. On 24 August 2006 passes on loan with the right of redemption to Pescara.

At the end of season he returns to Ternana, where he remained two seasons. In the summer session of the transfer passes outright to Grosseto in Serie B, and on 24 June 2011 passes to Spezia.

On 28 August 2012, after being released by Spezia, he signed a one-year contract with Carpi, where he gained promotion to Serie B.

In 2013, he moved to Lecce. He spent three seasons with the giallorossi and was captain of the team. He amassed a total of 87 appearances and scored 10 goals (including the play-offs).

In July 2016 he was signed by Matera on a free transfer with a two-year deal.

References

External links
 youtube.com
 Football.it Profile 
 
 

1983 births
Footballers from Rome
Living people
Italian footballers
Association football midfielders
Ternana Calcio players
A.C. Legnano players
F.C. Pavia players
Delfino Pescara 1936 players
F.C. Grosseto S.S.D. players
Spezia Calcio players
A.C. Carpi players
U.S. Lecce players
Matera Calcio players
U.S. Pistoiese 1921 players
Serie B players
Serie C players